Beaulandais is a former commune in the Orne department in northwestern France. On 1 January 2016, it was merged into the new commune of Juvigny Val d'Andaine.

Population

See also
Communes of the Orne department
Parc naturel régional Normandie-Maine

References

Former communes of Orne